Ferrera is a municipality of the Grisons, Switzerland.

Ferrera may also refer to:

Val Ferrera, a valley in Graubünden, Switzerland
Ferrera, the Romansh name of Schmitten, Grisons, Switzerland
Ferrera di Varese, Lombardy, Italy
Ferrera Erbognone, Province of Pavia, Lombardy, Italy

People

 America Ferrera (born 1984), American actress
 Benigno Ferrera (1893–1988), Italian cross-country skier
 Dennis Ferrera (born 1980), Honduran footballer
 Emilio Ferrera (born 1967), Belgian footballer and manager
 Francisco Ferrera (1794–1851), president of Honduras
 Giuseppe Ferrera (fl. 1928), Italian long-distance runner
 Manu Ferrera (born 1958), Spanish-born football coach
 Mario Ferrera (born 1987), Spanish male volleyball player
 Miguel Ferrera (born 1981), Honduran taekwondo practitioner
 Yannick Ferrera (born 1980), Belgian footballer and manager
 Yesenia Ferrera (born 1998), Cuban artistic gymnast

See also 

 Ferrara (disambiguation)
 Ferreira (disambiguation)